Leucania striata is a moth of the family Noctuidae. It is native to Japan, where it is known from the central to the western areas of Honshu, extending through Shikoku and Kyushu south to the Loochoos. It has also been recorded from Hawaii, where it is probably introduced.

External links
Leucania insecuta and L. striata Leech, Two distinct species

Leucania
Moths described in 1900